Víctor Pablo Pérez (born 1954, Burgos) is a Spanish conductor known for specializing in zarzuelas.

He was principal conductor and artistic director of the Symphony Orchestra of Asturias 1980-1988, and then of the Orquesta Sinfónica de Tenerife.

Discography
Francisco Barbieri: El barberillo de Lavapiés
Gonzalo Roig: :es:Cecilia Valdés

References

External links
Biography

1954 births
Living people
Spanish conductors (music)
Male conductors (music)
21st-century conductors (music)
21st-century male musicians
Spanish male musicians